Richard Crawford (born November 6, 1934) is an American sports shooter. He competed in the men's 50 metre free pistol event at the 1976 Summer Olympics.

References

1934 births
Living people
American male sport shooters
Olympic shooters of the United States
Shooters at the 1976 Summer Olympics
Sportspeople from Mount Vernon, New York
Pan American Games medalists in shooting
Pan American Games gold medalists for the United States
Shooters at the 1975 Pan American Games
20th-century American people
21st-century American people